José María Forqué Galindo  (8 March 1923 – 17 March 1995) was a Spanish screenwriter and film director.

Biography
He was the father of the actress Verónica Forqué and the director  Álvaro Forqué. He died on 17 March 1995 in Madrid at the age of 72 from a liver cancer. He was cremated at Cementerio de la Almudena. He was married to the actress and dramaturge Carmen Vázquez-Vigo, who died on 22 March 2018 at the age of 95.

The José María Forqué Awards are named after him.

Filmography
 1947 : Juventudes de España, bajo una Patria hermosa
 1951 : María Morena
 1951 : Fog and Sun
 1954 : The Devil Plays the Flute
 1954 : Un Día perdido
 1956 : The Legion of Silence
 1956 : Embajadores en el infierno
 1957 : Whom God Forgives
 1958 : Un Hecho violento
 1958 : Night and Dawn 
 1959 : Baila La Chunga
 1959 : Back to the Door
 1960 : Maribel and the Strange Family
 1960 : Police Calling 091
 1961 : Usted puede ser un asesino
 1962 : Searching for Monica
 1962 : Accident 703
 1962 : Atraco a las tres
 1963 : La becerrada
 1963 : El Juego de la verdad
 1964 : Tengo 17 años
 1964 : Casi un caballero
 1965 : Vacaciones para Ivette
 1965 : Black Humor (segment 2, "La Mandrilla - Miss Wilma")
 1966 : Balearic Caper 
 1966 : Las Viudas (episode "El Retrato de Regino")
 1967 : Un Millón en la basura
 1967 : Yo he visto a la muerte
 1967 : Las que tienen que servir
 1968 : Pecados conyugales
 1968 : La Vil seducción
 1968 : Un Diablo bajo la almohada
 1968 : ¡Dame un poco de amooor...!
 1969 : Estudio amueblado 2.P.
 1970 : El Triangulito
 1970 : El Monumento
 1971 : El Ojo del huracán
 1972 : La Cera virgen
 1973 : Tarot
 1974 : Una Pareja... distinta
 1974 : Lola
 1976 : Vuelve, querida Nati
 1976 : El Segundo poder
 1976 : Madrid, Costa Fleming
 1979 : La Mujer de la tierra caliente
 1980 : ¡Qué verde era mi duque!
 1980 : El Canto de la cigarra
 1982 : "Ramón y Cajal" (Serie TV)
 1980 : "El Español y los siete pecados capitales" (serie TV)
 1983 : "El Jardín de Venus" (serie TV)
 1986 : Romanza final
 1988 : "Miguel Servet, la sangre y la ceniza" (serie TV)
 1994 : Nexus 2.431

References

External links

 

1923 births
1995 deaths
People from Zaragoza
Spanish film directors
Film directors from Aragon
Spanish male screenwriters
Honorary Goya Award winners
Deaths from cancer in Spain
Deaths from liver cancer
20th-century Spanish screenwriters
20th-century Spanish male writers